Kaushal S. Inamdar (born 2 October 1971) is an Indian music composer and singer in Marathi and Hindi movies. His work in music spans from composing music for films, television, drama to events, concerts in Hindi and Marathi, composing music for ballets, advertisements, and also albums. He is currently settled at Goregaon, a Mumbai suburb.

Early life
Kaushal did his schooling from IES Modern English School, Dadar and Billimoria High School, Panchgani. Thereafter he graduated from the D. G. Ruparel College, Mumbai, where he came in contact with Chetan Datar who initiated him into theatre. While in school, he had taken some primary lessons from Kamalakar Bhagwat, a renowned music composer himself, but he began learning the finer nuances of music composition only after he finished graduation concentrated on writing and music. He did writing apprentice under Lekh Tandon and also had a short stint as a writer in television soaps. As he found himself more of a natural musician, he settled with music as his creative career. His Guru, Pt. Satyasheel Deshpande, an eminent Hindustani vocalist and musicologist is known for his insightful study of North Indian Classical music.

Musical associations
Kaushal has worked with a lot of talented artists—singers and musicians. Some of them include — Shankar Mahadevan, Pt. Satyasheel Deshpande, Sadhana Sargam, Suresh Wadkar, Shreya Ghoshal, Mahalaxmi Iyer, Raghunandan Panshikar, Shubha Joshi, Ninad Kamath, Sanjeev Chimmalgi, Hamsika Iyer, Swanand Kirkire, Ravindra Sathe, Shilpa Pai, Sonali Karnik, Shobha Joshi, Karsan Sagathia, Kirti Sagathia, Sanjeevani Bhelande, and many others.

Kaushal has been one of the mentors for the program Idea Saregamapa on Zee Marathi.

Personal life
Kaushal is married to Suchitra Inamdar. She has a M.A. degree in psychology and works as a psychotherapist having her own practice in Malad West. Kaushal and Suchitra have a son, Anurag Inamdar

Works
 Music for the Official CD ROM – Miss World 1996 in Bangalore, India
Composed a song for 'Celebrating India' which was performed by greats like Pt. Satish Vyas (santoor), Pt. Bhavani Shankar (pakhawaj), Kala Ramnath (violin), Purbayan Chatterjee] (sitar), Pt. Rupak Kulkarni (flute), Sanjeev Chimmalgi] (vocals) at the Gateway of India, 2003
Composed the invocation song for the opening ceremony of the Mumbai Festival, which was sung by 63 school-children in January 2005
Recreated 'Bilhan', a musical by Mangesh Padgaonkar & P. L. Deshpande after a gap of 50 years
'Gaganzhula', a programme based on new Marathi music and choreography
'Rain Raga' – a fusion concert on the rains with Louiz Banks, George Brooks, Rupak Kulkarni, Sanjeev Chimmalgi, Hamsika Iyer, Gino Banks, Sheldon D'Silva, Vinayak Netke, Ravindra Chary, and Rafique Ahmed. Produced by Pancham Nishad Creatives.
 The Marathi Abhimaangeet is perhaps Kaushal's most famous work till date. Kaushal was inspired to work on this song after he was told that playing Marathi music on FM radio in Mumbai is considered downmarket. This song is sung by 112 eminent and well-known singers and 300+ chorus singers.

Filmography

Discography
Shubhra Kalya Moothbhar – based on the poetry of Late Smt. Shanta Shelke
Singers – Pt. Satyasheel Deshpande, Sadhana Sargam, Ranjana Jogalekar, etc.
Ratra Bhizali – songs of the night
Singers – Shankar Mahadevan, Mahalaxmi Iyer, Sameer Date, etc.
Geetecha to saakshi vadala – a translation of Shri Nagaraja Rao's poem – 'The Geeta's Witness'
Artsite – Shri Vidyadhar Gokhale.
Bhavanjali – a devotional Hindi Album based on the philosophy of Swami Samarth Ramdas
Rendered by famous classical vocalist, Shri Raghunandan Panshikar
Kamana Purti – an album for Sony Music, rendered by Sanjeev Chimmalgi.
Man Pakharache Hoi – Milind Gunaji's poems set to tune.
Chaphyache Shimpan – an album composed by Kaushal S. Inamdar, with songs rendered by Sonali Karnik.

References

External links
Kaushal Inamdar – Official Website
Kaushal Inamdar – Music in the world of noise (Blog)

Its Breaking News – Official website of the movie Its Breaking News
Article on Kaushal in Maharashtra Times on Saturday (MOSS) on 23 June 2007
Ase Janmate Gaane – Review of the program held at Gadkari Rangayatan in Thane

1971 births
Living people
Marathi people
Indian film score composers
Music directors
Marathi playback singers
Indian male playback singers
Marathi-language singers
Musicians from Pune
Indian male film score composers